Salahuddin (March 30, 1926October 26, 2003) was a Bangladeshi filmmaker.

Career

Salahuddin made his directorial debut through the film Je Nadi Marupathe (1961). He then created Surjasnan (1962). His most notable work was the film Rupban (1965), which was based on a folk story.

Works
 Je Nadi Maro Pothey (1961)
 Surja Snan (1962)
 Dharapat (1963)
 Rupban (1965, Bengali/Urdu)
 Alomati (1969)

References

Footnotes

Bibliography

External links
 

1926 births
2003 deaths
Bangladeshi film directors